Óscar Salas (born 8 December 1993) is a Honduran footballer.  He represented Honduras in the football competition at the 2016 Summer Olympics.  He currently plays for C.D. Honduras Progreso.

International career
Salas got his first call up to the senior Honduras side for a friendly against Belize in October 2016.

International goals
Scores and results list Honduras' goal tally first.

References

Honduran footballers
1993 births
Living people
Footballers at the 2016 Summer Olympics
Olympic footballers of Honduras
Honduras international footballers
2017 Copa Centroamericana players
Copa Centroamericana-winning players
Association football midfielders
Central American Games gold medalists for Honduras
Central American Games medalists in football
Liga Nacional de Fútbol Profesional de Honduras players
C.D. Olimpia players
Juticalpa F.C. players
F.C. Motagua players